Begzade (Kurdish), Beyzade (Turkic), and Begzadići (Slavic), Beizadea (Romanian), Begzadi (female) are titles given within the Ottoman Empire to provisional governors and military generals who are descendants of noble households and occupy important positions within the empire. The term "Beyzade" often appears in Western accounts of the Ottoman Empire as superiors within the society, usually men who held much authority. In Eastern Europe, the Balkans, the Caucasus, and some parts of Anatolia and Iraqi Kurdistan, the title of Beyzade was given to Circassian princes who led parts of the Ottoman conquest in these regions.

Social status 
The Begzade as a caste developed in Kurdistan among some of the chief tribes and householders such as those of the Jaffs, Khoshnaws, Feylis Berwaris and the Bayat Begzade family descendants . Begzade formed the dominant class of the tribe or household. They did not intermarry with socially inferior tribespeople; however, a member of the Begzade could be part of the caste both by kinship ties to the ruling lineage and as one of their retainers. Although regarded as Kurds, the Begzade come from an ethnically mixed background, as most of them have Circassian origins.

See also
 Beg or Baig
 Behzadi
 Khanzada
 Shahzada
 Sahibzada
 Begzadići

Notes

References

Kurdish tribes
Kurdish culture
Ottoman titles
Titles in Bosnia and Herzegovina during Ottoman period
Titles in Serbia
Titles in Pakistan
Titles in India
Royal titles
Kurdish words and phrases